Boraj-Kazipura is a census town in Ajmer tehsil of Ajmer district of Rajasthan state in India. The census town and village falls under Hathi khera gram panchayat.

Demography
As per 2011 census of India, Boraj-Kazipura has population of 5,111 of which 4,527 are males and 4,253 are females. Sex ratio of the census town and village is 939.

Transportation
Boraj-Kazipura is connected by air (Kishangarh Airport), by train (Ajmer Junction railway station) and by road.

See also
Ajmer Tehsil
Lake Foy Sagar

References

Census towns in Ajmer district
Cities and towns in Ajmer district